Matt DeCaro is an American film and stage actor.  He is arguably best known for his role as Correctional Officer Roy Geary on the television series Prison Break.

Biography 
DeCaro has appeared in numerous American television series, including Crime Story, ER, Law & Order: Special Victims Unit, CSI: Crime Scene Investigation, Cold Case, NYPD Blue, 24, The Office, NCIS, Curb Your Enthusiasm, Boston Legal, House, Eli Stone, The Chicago Code, Boss, Chicago P.D., and Chicago Fire.

He has also appeared in the films Richie Rich (1994), U.S. Marshals (1998), Mr. 3000 (2004), Eagle Eye (2008), Baby on Board (2009), and The Wise Kids (2011).

His stage work includes the Victory Gardens Theater's production of Symmetry and the role of Mr. Meyers in the world premiere of Rebecca Gilman's 1999 play Spinning into Butter.

Filmography

References

External links

 Goodman Theatre bio of Matt DeCaro

Year of birth missing (living people)
Living people
American male film actors
American male television actors